SIA Ltd was a UK Limited company specialising in Geographic Information System (GIS) software and services. The company offices were based in London, England.

History
The company was bought by Hometrack in July 2007. It was based near the Eccleston Square Hotel, off the A3213.

Products
 dataMAP GIS
 dataMAP GIS Web Browser
 dataMAP Mobile
 dataMAP Routing System
 SMART
 SMART Online
 dataMAPX and SMARTX SDKs

Partners
 Ordnance Survey
 Plantech
 National Housing Federation
 IBS OPENSystems
 Encanvas
 Bartholomew Maps
 Arete
 Anite

Competitors
 GGP Systems Ltd
 ESRI
 MapInfo

References
 SIA Ltd's home page

Companies based in the City of Westminster
British companies disestablished in 2007
GIS companies